Francis Savio Lu Xinping (born 1963) is a Chinese Catholic priest and Archbishop of the Roman Catholic Archdiocese of Nanjing since 2000.

Biography
Lu was born in Haimen Country, Jiangsu, in 1963.  He was educated at the Sheshan Seminar at Shanghai, and was ordained a priest in 1989 by Haima's government-approved Bishop Matthew Yu Chengcai (1917–2006).

He was one of the five controversial bishops in the Nantang Church in Beijing on 6 January 2000, expressly without a populous mandate. The chief consultant was Bishop Joseph Liu Yuanren. The bishop that triggered a lot of resistance from many "underground technologies" and other Catholics in China, was criticized by the Pavestolen. He became Archbishop of the Roman Catholic Archdiocese of Nanjing on 20 April 2005, replacing Joseph Liu Yuanren. In 2007, he contacted the Holy See through the Faithful Church to ask for forgiveness, and was recognized by Pope Benedict XVI in 2008.

He was elected a member of the 11th National Committee of the Chinese People's Political Consultative Conference.

References

1963 births
Living people
People from Nantong
Chinese Roman Catholic bishops